UFC 119: Mir vs. Cro Cop was a mixed martial arts event held by the Ultimate Fighting Championship on September 25, 2010, at Conseco Fieldhouse in Indianapolis, Indiana, United States. The event was the first that the UFC hosted in Indiana.

Background
On August 15, 2010, Antônio Rodrigo Nogueira had to pull out of his bout with Frank Mir due to an injury that would require surgery. It later was reported to be a recurring hip injury. Mirko Cro Cop replaced Nogueira in the main event. The Mir/Nogueira was rescheduled and took place at  UFC 140 in December 2011.

Aaron Riley was expected to face UFC newcomer Pat Audinwood at this event, but Riley was forced from the card with an injury and was replaced by Thiago Tavares.

UFC 119 featured preliminary fights live on Spike TV and ESPN UK.

Results

Bonus awards
Fighters were awarded $70,000 bonuses.

Fight of the Night: Sean Sherk vs. Evan Dunham and Matt Mitrione vs. Joey Beltran
Knockout of the Night: None awarded
Submission of the Night: C.B. Dollaway

References

See also
 Ultimate Fighting Championship
 List of UFC champions
 List of UFC events
 2010 in UFC

Ultimate Fighting Championship events
2010 in mixed martial arts
Mixed martial arts in Indiana
Sports competitions in Indianapolis
2010 in Indiana